João Pedro Fernandes (born 9 March 1975), known as João Pedro, is a Portuguese retired footballer who played as a striker.

Over the course of six seasons, he amassed Primeira Liga totals of 147 matches and 38 goals, mainly at S.C. Salgueiros.

Club career
Born in Pontoise, on the suburbs of Paris, João Pedro started his professional career with Vieira S.C. in the Terceira Divisão, reaching S.C. Salgueiros four years later, where he would spend the majority of his career, eventually becoming team captain.

After scoring 12 goals in 34 games in his last season, not being able to prevent relegation from the Primeira Liga, João Pedro signed with C.D. Santa Clara also in the top flight. He retired in 2007 at the age of 32, after four years with Leixões S.C. in the Segunda Liga.

References

External links

1975 births
Living people
Sportspeople from Pontoise
Portuguese expatriates in France
Portuguese footballers
Association football forwards
Primeira Liga players
Liga Portugal 2 players
Segunda Divisão players
AD Fafe players
G.D. Ribeirão players
S.C. Salgueiros players
C.D. Santa Clara players
Leixões S.C. players
Footballers from Val-d'Oise